Elachista zernyi is a moth of the family Elachistidae that is found in Fennoscandia, Germany, Austria, Switzerland and Italy. It is also found in North America.

References

External links
Moth Photographers Group

zernyi
Moths described in 1974
Moths of Europe
Moths of North America